The 2005 Triglav Trophy was held between 13 and 17 April 2005. It was an international figure skating competition held annually in Jesenice, Slovenia. Skaters competed in the disciplines of men's singles, ladies' singles, and pair skating across the levels of senior, junior, and novice, although the pair skating competition was only held on the junior level.

Senior results

Men

Ladies

Junior results

Men

Ladies

Pairs

Novice results

Men

Ladies

External links
 2005 Triglav Trophy results (Archived)

Triglav Trophy, 2005
Triglav Trophy